Dickinson Center is a hamlet in Franklin County, New York, United States; located in Dickinson, New York. Dickinson Center has a post office with ZIP code 12930, which opened on February 3, 1842.

References

Hamlets in Franklin County, New York
Hamlets in New York (state)